The Grateful Dead was an American rock band known for their extensive touring and constantly varying set lists, including many cover songs from various musical genres.

References 

 Cover
Grateful Dead